The Sunderland River Formation is a geologic formation in Nunavut. It preserves fossils dating back to the Devonian period.

See also

 List of fossiliferous stratigraphic units in Nunavut

References
 

Devonian Nunavut
Devonian southern paleotropical deposits